Barton Gate is a village in Staffordshire, England.For population details at the 2011 census see Barton-under-Needwood.

Villages in Staffordshire